Sami Guediri (born August 18, 1997) is an American professional soccer player who plays as a midfielder for ES Sétif.

Club career
In 2023, he joined ES Sétif.

Personal life
Guediri was born in the United States to Algerian parents.

References

External links
 

1997 births
Living people
SIMA Águilas players
Greenville Triumph SC players
Inter Miami CF II players
USL League Two players
USL League One players
American soccer players
American people of Algerian descent
Association football defenders
Sportspeople from Boca Raton, Florida
Soccer players from Florida
Inter Miami CF players
Major League Soccer players
Loudoun United FC players
D.C. United players
American expatriate soccer players in Germany
ES Sétif players
Algerian Ligue Professionnelle 1 players